Mayahauri is a village and a gram panchayat within the jurisdiction of the Jaynagar police station in the Jaynagar II CD block in the Baruipur subdivision of the South 24 Parganas district in the Indian state of West Bengal.

Geography

Demographics
As per 2011 Census of India, Mayahauri had a total population of 19,604.

Transport
Dakshin Barasat-Dhosa Road links Mayahauri to the State Highway 1.

Baharu railway station is located nearby.

Healthcare
There is a primary health centre, with 6 beds, at Mayahauri.

References

Villages in South 24 Parganas district
Neighbourhoods in Jaynagar Majilpur